Run BTS (also stylized as Run BTS!) is a South Korean variety web series starring boy band BTS. The series broadcasts weekly and has been offered for free viewing on V Live since 2015 and Weverse since 2020. In each episode, the band members play games or participate in a variety of activities that require them to complete challenges, and sometimes carry out secret missions, in order to earn prizes or receive punishments.

Three seasons of the show, comprising 156 episodes, have been released since it premiered on August 1, 2015, with new episodes airing every Tuesday. On August 16, 2022, a special episode—the first new episode following a 10-month-long hiatus after season three ended in October 2021—was released, and later uploaded to BTS' official YouTube channel. Since then, all episodes—new and old—have been made available on the platform.

Broadcast 
The first season of Run BTS premiered on V Live, a South Korean live video streaming service, on August 1, 2015. Episodes generally aired every Tuesday, except for when an episode of BTS Gayo was released instead. The series went on a year-long hiatus after the January 5, 2016, episode. The second season premiered on January 31, 2017. The series began consistently airing new episodes weekly as of the May 23, 2017, episode. The third season premiered on January 1, 2019. In 2020, the season's broadcast was paused twice: first for the airing of the band's documentary series Break The Silence in May, and then for their new reality show BTS In the Soop, which ran from the second week of August until the third week of October. In 2021, the series went on a brief hiatus at the beginning of May through mid-June to accommodate promotions for the release of the band's new song at that time. This was followed by a second temporary hiatus in October—after the season three finale on the 12th—for the airing of the second season of BTS In the Soop which premiered on the 15th.

In June 2022, during BTS' ninth anniversary celebrations, the band revealed they would be focusing more on solo endeavours going forward, but emphasized that they would continue to film Run BTS as a group. A two-part special—the first new episode to be released in 10 months—premiered on August 16. This marked the first time an episode was officially made available on YouTube. Several weeks prior, Hybe announced that subsequent episodes would also be uploaded to the platform, but did not provide a release schedule at the time.

Format 
Each episode of Run BTS features the members of BTS taking on activities relevant to the episode's theme, usually in the form of games, missions or challenges, with the promise of a prize(s) if they are successful, or punishments if they fail. The members tackle each task as a group, individual teams, or on a solo basis if required. Special episodes occasionally feature non-competitive activities, such as a fashion show, skits, or drama making. Most episodes are led by an MC, with one of the members filling the role of host for the day, and the production staff who facilitate the missions. Jin and Suga serve as MC's the most often—J-Hope, RM, and V have intermittently assumed MC duties as well. For episodes with missions that require the full group's participation, all members act as presenters.

Episode runtimes initially spanned 8–15 minutes. From the second season onwards, they were increased to 20–40 minutes. In 2020, they were further expanded to a more consistent runtime of 30–40 minutes. Short clips of exclusive behind-the-scenes footage are uploaded after each episode airs. Originally posted on the paid BTS+ Vlive fanship channel beginning in 2017, Big Hit Entertainment moved the clips to its official fan community platform Weverse beginning January 16, 2020, as exclusive subscription-based paid content.

Promotion
BTS uploaded two videos advertising the then upcoming new variety show to their V Live channel on February 28, 2015. The first video received 242,000 views and 2.24 million likes, and the second received 100,000 views and 87,000 likes within three days of being posted.

Episodes

Series overview

Season 1 (2015–16)

Season 2 (2017–18)

Season 3 (2019–21)

2022

Reception

Adaptation 
On July 10, 2018, domestic news media announced that cable music channel Mnet would begin airing eight of the most popular Run BTS episodes on television at 6PM KST every Wednesday night beginning July 11 for eight weeks. Season 2's "MT" (Ep.17–18) and "Manito" (Ep. 23–24) episodes were among those selected. The eighth and final episode aired on August 29.

In 2020, Mnet announced on August 6 that it would once again be airing eight of the most popular episodes from among those released between 2019 and 2020 as a summer vacation television special—the 100th Episode Special, Avatar Cooking King, and Photo Exhibition episodes were included in the lineup. Episodes aired every Thursday night at 8PM KST from August 6 for eight weeks until September 24. The network additionally aired the Season 3 2019 episode, "Hangul Day Special", on October 1 as a Chuseok special.

On April 1, 2021, South Korean cable television network JTBC announced a 10-week long Spring special programming block of content from Hybe Labels artists that began airing that same date on JTBC2—every Thursday night at 7:30PM KST. Run! BTS was included in the lineup for BTS. Two new episodes of the series premiered on television first, and then on Weverse and Vlive afterwards.

Accolades
Run BTS was nominated for and won Best V Original at the 2018 V Live Awards.

Notes

References

External links 
Run BTS episode playlist on V Live

BTS
South Korean web series
South Korean variety television shows